Bill Black is a musician who also casts and directs voice actors and performs sound effects design.

Early life
Bill Black (real name William Thomas Blackwell III) was born in Long Beach, California. August 18, 1960. He started out in music on bass guitar in the Los Angeles clubs with a rockabilly trio, James Intveld and the Rockin' Shadows.
Black left and was replaced by Patrick Woodward. The band split up when Ricky Nelson asked drummer Ricky Intveld and Woodward to join his backing band. All were killed on 31 December 1985 when the plane in which they were travelling crashed in De Kalb, Texas less than two miles from a landing strip at approximately 5.14pm. In 1983 Black joined the Huntington Beach pop punk rock group "The Earwigs" and stayed with them until they split up in 1987.

Career
In the late 1980s, Black was contracted by Activision to create audio and MIDI tracks for their games. In 1995 he began sound design & casting & directing character voice over for video games under the name Big Fat Kitty Productions (later Bill Black Audio Video). He worked with Geoff Farr to design sound for Gina & TL, a 2002 Sundance Film Festival pick for animated shorts. The same year, Black and composer Paul Chiten created the sound that opens and closes the Tokyo Stock Exchange. Black is now the CFO of Buzzart Enterprises Inc., the publishing company of Buzzy Linhart. Black currently lectures regularly at USC Viterbi School of Engineering and is also voiceover casting and dialogue director.

Television and film
Black’s musical compositions have been used in Law and Order and the Showtime series StreetTime.

CBS Series Law and Order Criminal Intent Episode 119  with Paul Chiten.

CBS Movie of the Week Spring Break Shark Attack with Paul Chiten.

ABC Sports The Extremist with John Sinclair

Showtime The Red Shoe Diaries Episode 15 Forbidden Zone with Jay Reynolds

Video games
 Mech Warrior II Activision 1993 Music MIDI File editing, dialogue post-production, Japanese, Korean, French, German Japanese network dialogue 
 Shanghai Activision 1993 Music MIDI File editing
 Return To Zork Activision 1994 Music MIDI File editing
 Mech Warrior II Ghost Bears Legacy Activision 1995 casting, directing, dialogue post-production, sound effects design, voiceover acting
 Jumpstart Toddlers Knowledge Adventures 1995 sound effects design
 Sacred Ground Activision 1996 Dialogue post-production, mixing
 Hyperblade Activision 1996 Additional sound effects design, voiceover acting, dialogue post-production
 Blast Chamber Activision 1996 Sound effects design Dialogue post-production
 Elk Moon Murders Activision 1996 Dialogue post-production
 Johnny Quest Virgin Sound and Vision 1996 Sound effects design, dialogue post-production
 Nanotek Warrior Activision 1996 Sound effects design
 Mech Warrior II Mercenaries Activision 1996 voiceover direction and editing, Sound effects design, voiceover acting, German Recording and Mixing
 Zork Nemesis Activision 1996 Additional Sound effects design, Japanese, German Dialogue post-production
 Muppets Activision 1996 Music MIDI File editing Sound effects design
 Spycraft Activision 1996 Dialogue post-production MIDI File Programming, Archive M&E
 Zork French Activision 1997 Dialogue post-production
 Zork Inquisitor Activision 1997 Dialogue post-production
 Muppets Activision 1997 Dialogue post-production, Music MIDI file editing, Additional sound effects design
 I-76 German Activision 1997 Dialogue post-production
 Asteroids Activision 1998 Sound effects design
 Battlezone Activision 1997 Produced and co-directed voiceover, Dialogue post-production Sound effects design Mixed Cinematic Cut scenes and Dialogue post-production on Japanese Version
 Vigilante 8 Activision 1998 Casting Dialogue post-production
 Screaming Demons Activision 1998 Casting, Producing, and Co-Directing voiceover in English & German, Authored the Script for All Radio Segments, Sound effects design
 Jade Cocoon Crave Entertainment 1999 Dialogue post-production, Cut scene Mixing
 Call To Power Activision 1998 Casting, Directing, Sound effects design, Italian, German, French Castilian Dialogue Editing, Recording, Futzing, Mixing
 Tigger Disney 2000 Dialogue Editing, Mixing German, Danish, Dutch, French, Italian, Castilian
 Jet Ski Crave 2000 Dialogue post-production voiceover Actor
 Dark Reign Activision 1997 Sound effects design Dialogue post-production Mixing German, French, and Spanish
 Call To Power II Activision 2002 Casting, Directing, Sound effects design, Dialogue post-production Mixed Cinematic Cut scenes for Italian, German French, Iberian Spanish
 Mission Bravo Mattel/Gigawatt 2000 Sound effects design
 Little Mermaid Disney 2000 Dialogue post-production, Mixing German, Italian, French, Dutch, Spanish
 Aerowings Crave 2000 Casting, Directing Dialogue post-production
 Dinosaur Disney 2000 Dialogue post-production
 Ripmax RC Simulator Inertia 2000 Sound effects design
 Dark Reign II Pandemic 2000 Dialogue post-production, Recording, Mixing Sound effects design
 Star Trek Red Squad Activision 2000 Dialogue post-production
 Vampire Redemption Activision 20000 Dialogue Editing, Recording
 Toy Story II UK Activision 2000 M&E Editing for Localization
 Galerians Crave Entertainment 2000 Dialogue post-production Mixing Cut scenes
 Aerowings II Crave Entertainment 2000 Casting, Directing, Dialogue Post Production
 Shanghai Second Dynasty Activision 2000 Casting, Dialogue Post Production, Sound effects design
 Kessen II Koei 2001 Line Producer, Dialogue post-production, Cinematic Mixing
 The Weakest Link Activision 2001 Casting, Directing, Dialogue post-production
 Neverwinter Nights Atari 2002 Character voiceover Producing & Co-Directing
 Return to Castle Wolfenstein Activision 2002 Mix Cinematics for German, French, Italian, Sound effects design E-3 Demo
 Wrath Unleashed Lucas Arts 2003 Sound effects design
 Delta Force Team Sabre Novalogic 2003 Casting, Dialogue post-production
 Joint Ops Escalation Novalogic 2004 Casting, Directing, Dialogue post-production
 Joint Ops Typhoon Rising Novalogic 2004 Casting, Sound Design for Cinematic Cut Scenes
 Shadow Ops Red Mercury Atari 2004 Casting, Directing (six languages) Dialogue Post Production
 Delta Force Xtreme Novalogic 2005 Weapon SFX, Casting, Directing, Dialogue Post Production
 Delta Force Black Hawk Down Xbox & PC Novalogic 2003 2005 Casting, Directing, Dialogue Post Production 
 Lineage II The Chaotic Chronicles NC Soft 2005 Casting, Directing, dialogue post-production
 Top Gun Mastiff 2005 Cinematic Sound effects design
 World of Warcraft The Burning Crusade Vivendi Games 2007 Blizzard voiceover Casting
 Monkwerks Monkey Gods LLC - Dreamhive 2009 Sound effects design Composed Theme Song
 Snood Electronic Arts - Monkey Gods LLC 2009 Sound effects design and voiceover acting and postproduction
 War Inc. Battlezone Warmongers Inc 2011 Sound effects design
 Captain Fox 1 Pirate of the Mist Giunti Editore 2011 Cast & Directed US English Character Voice Over
 Captain Fox 2 The Phantom of the Seven Seas Giunti Editore 2011 Cast & Directed US English Character Voice Over
 Reality Fighters Sony Computer Entertainment Europe 2012 Additional Casting & Directing US English Cast & Directed US English Character Voice Over
 Toy Soldiers Cold War Microsoft 2012 Cast & Directed Russian & Vietnamese Character Voice Over
 Demons Score Square Enix Tokyo 2012 Cast & Directed English Character Voice Over
 Renaissance Heroes Chang You 2012 Cast & Directed additional English Character Voice Over
 Bravely Default Nintendo Square Enix 2014 Cast & Directed English Character Voice Over
 Lineage 2 Revolution NC Soft Net Marble 2017 Cast & Directed English Character Voice Over

References

External links
 Official site
 
 Interview discussing his games work

American rock bass guitarists
Musicians from Long Beach, California
American rockabilly musicians
American chief financial officers
American casting directors
American voice directors
1960 births
Living people
Guitarists from California
American male bass guitarists
20th-century American bass guitarists
Country musicians from California
20th-century American male musicians